ReWiggled is a double album by Australian children's music band the Wiggles and various artists, released on 11 March 2022. Disc one is a tribute album of the Wiggles' songs reinterpreted by Australian artists and disc two is a studio album by the Wiggles covering some of their all-time favourite songs.

The album was announced on 15 December 2021. In a press release, Anthony Field said: "It's been really enjoyable and also so humbling, hearing all these wonderful artists doing their versions of Wiggles songs – they're all so very talented. And it's been a real thrill to get back in the studio together with all the Wiggles – the current members and the OG's – to record some cover versions of our own." A five track sampler was released digitally on the same day.

ReWiggled debuted at number one on the ARIA Albums Chart, becoming the Wiggles' first number-one album in Australia.

The album won Best Children's Album at the 2022 ARIA Music Awards. It has also been nominated for Best Record at the 2023 Shure Rolling Stones Australia Awards.

Track listing

Charts

Weekly charts

Year-end charts

Release history

References

External links
 
 

2022 albums
The Wiggles albums
Tribute albums